Balingit is a Filipino surname of Kapampangan origin. Notable people with the surname include:

Bonel Balingit (born 1967), Filipino basketball player
JoAnn Balingit, American poet and nonfiction writer

Kapampangan-language surnames